Ashish Bagai (born 26 January 1982) is the former captain of the Canadian cricket team. He is a right-handed batsman who specialises as a wicketkeeper.

Early life 
He studied at St. Columba's School during his brief stay in Delhi, India. He moved to Canada at the age of 11.

Career

Early years 
His first taste of cricket came in the inaugural Under-15s Cricket World Cup in 1996, in which he was voted the tournament's best wicketkeeper. He had the highest batting average in the Under-19s World Cup in January – February 2000. Going to the 2002 Under-19s World Cup, his batting was invaluable, securing a tie with Bangladesh.

He has since become a face of the Canadian cricket team. He has played 52 One Day Internationals, more than any other Canadian player. Indeed, he has played every Canadian ODI since he made his debut in the 2003 World Cup against Bangladesh. The only Canadian ODIs he has not played in were the three that took place before his birth.

Despite his permanent position in the Canadian ODI team, he missed the 2005 ICC Trophy, though he did play the 2001 tournament, the highlight of which was an innings that took the Canadians to victory over the UAE after spending a night in hospital due to being hit in the face when keeping.

He holds the Canadian record for highest ODI score after his unbeaten 137 in a losing cause against Scotland. In that same ODI he set a record in One Day International cricket for facing the most number of balls in an ODI innings when batting at number three position(172) He added 100 runs for 4th wicket with Asif Mulla which was the first ever century stand for Canada in an ODI.

2011 World Cup and later years 
Bagai captained the Canadian team during the 2011 Cricket World Cup and made 64* against Kenya off 97 balls as Canada won their first match of the tournament. This was the second World Cup win Canada had registered. Against New Zealand in the following ODI he scored 84 off 87 balls and he shared a 100+ partnership with Jimmy Hansra, Hansra eventually made 70*. However Canada lost by 70 runs as New Zealand managed to score 358 in the first innings.

References

External links
 

1982 births
Living people
Canadian cricketers
Indian emigrants to Canada
Cricketers from Delhi
Canada One Day International cricketers
Canada Twenty20 International cricketers
Cricketers at the 2003 Cricket World Cup
Cricketers at the 2007 Cricket World Cup
Cricketers at the 2011 Cricket World Cup
St. Columba's School, Delhi alumni
Canadian sportspeople of Indian descent
Ragama Cricket Club cricketers
Wicket-keepers